Darren Ockert is an English pop singer, songwriter and record producer born in Lincoln, Lincolnshire, England, currently residing in Miami, Florida, United States.

Biography

Early life and career
Darren Ockert was born in Lincoln, England. After graduating from The London School of Musical Theatre he established a theatre production company called Darren Ockert Productions in London at the Young Vic Theatre. In 1999, Ockert became one of the youngest producers to win a prestigious TMA Award for his co-production with the Young Vic Theatre Company of Arabian Nights. On 29 September 2000, this production of Arabian Nights played a limited run Off-Broadway on 42nd Street in New York City at the New Victory Theater.

1998–1999 theatre productions 
 National UK tour of The Canterville Ghost which starred the 1968 Academy Award-nominated actor Ron Moody
 European premiere production of Scooter Thomas Makes It to the Top of the World by the American playwright Peter Parnell
 Three Lost Souls at the Battersea Arts Centre and King's Head Theatre in London
 The Little Match Girl at The Bull Theatre in London
 Late at The Young Vic Studio Theatre in London

Music 
In 2005, Ockert released his first album, Anything Is Possible. In 2006, he was nominated for an OutMusic Award in the category "Outstanding New Recording – Debut Male" and was subsequently featured in interviews in the June 2006 Pride issues of the international publications Genre and Instinct.

Other projects 
Ockert has produced the artist Sami Raad and collaborated with the pop-singer and songwriter Nathan Leigh Jones

Discography

Albums
Anything Is Possible (2005)
Short Story Long (2013)

EPs
The Limit - Remixes (2006)Out of the Rain - Remixes (2007)Celebrity du Jour - The Remixes (2009)The Rain From London (2012)

Singles
From Anything Is Possible:
"The Limit" (2006)
"Celebrity du Jour" (2009)

From Short Story Long:
"You Don't Know Me" (2013)

Awards and nominations
OutMusic Awards
OutMusic is an organisation that started with the objective to raise awareness about openly gay and lesbian artists and their music. In 2001, the organisation introduced the first annual OutMusic Awards to increase the popularity of LGBT musicians. Ockert has received one nomination.

RightOutTV Music & Video Awards

Film awards
In 2012, the director Hector M. Sanchez Jr. started filming a mini-documentary about Ockert during the recording of the album Short Story Long''. The documentary was debuted at the Enzian FilmSlam Film Festival on 17 February 2013 and won the top honour of Best Short Film.

UK Songwiting Contest
The UK Songwriting Contest is an international contest that invites entries from all parts of the world. Ockert has received one finalist and three semi-finalist awards.

TMA Awards
The TMA Awards, established in 1991, are presented annually by the Theatrical Management Association in recognition of creative excellence and outstanding work in United Kingdom theatres. In 2011, the ceremony was renamed the Theatre Awards UK. Ockert has won one award.

References

External links
 www.darrenockert.com
 Darren Ockert on MySpace

Year of birth missing (living people)
Living people
English male singer-songwriters
English pop singers
People from Lincoln, England
Musicians from New York City